Zarya is a rural locality (a settlement) and the administrative center of Zaryanskoye Rural Settlement, Kalachyovsky District, Volgograd Oblast, Russia. The population was 664 as of 2010. There are 6 streets.

Geography 
Zarya is located on the west bank of the Varvarovskoye Reservoir, 59 km southeast of Kalach-na-Donu (the district's administrative centre) by road. Parkhomenko is the nearest rural locality.

References 

Rural localities in Kalachyovsky District